Thomas or Tommy Ward may refer to:

Politicians
Thomas Ward (diplomat), British minister to Russia, 1730–1731
Thomas Ward (New Jersey politician) (1759–1842), U.S. congressman from New Jersey
Thomas Ward, Baron Ward (1810–1859), English jockey and finance minister in Italy
Thomas B. Ward (1835–1892), U.S. congressman from Indiana
Thomas H. Ward (1867–1951), American politician
Thomas W. Ward (1807–1872), Irish-born mayor of Austin, Texas
Thomas Ward (MP), Member of Parliament (MP) for Derby
Thomas Asline Ward (1781–1871), English politician and Master Cutler from Sheffield

Sports
Thomas Ward (cricketer) (1905–1989), Irish cricketer
Thomas Ward (rugby union) (1874–1942), Australian rugby union player
Thomas Ward (wrestler) (1907–1986), Scottish freestyle sport wrestler
Thomas Patrick Ward (born 1994), British boxer
Tommy Ward (cricketer) (1887–1936), South African cricketer
Tommy Ward (footballer, born 1913) (1913–1997), English football wing-half/forward, played for Port Vale and others in the 1930s
Tommy Ward (footballer, born 1917) (1917–1992), English football forward, played for Sheffield Wednesday and Darlington in the 1940s/1950s
Tom Ward (curler), Canadian curler and coach
Pinky Ward (Thomas Ward), Negro leagues baseball player

Writers
Thomas Ward (author) (1652–1708), English author who converted to Catholicism
Thomas Humphry Ward (1845–1926), English author

Others
Thomas Ward (actor), Australian actor and writer
Thomas Ward (mathematician) (born 1963), British mathematician
Thomas Marcus Decatur Ward (1823–1894), African American preacher, church leader, and abolitionist
Thomas J. Ward (1837–1924), American Civil War soldier
Thomas Lee Ward (1936–1995), executed American murderer
Thomas William Ward (industrialist) (1853–1926), shipbreaker from Sheffield, England
Thomas Ward (fictional character), a young boy from The Wardstone Chronicles
Tom Ward (born 1971), British actor
Tom L. Ward, American businessman in Oklahoma City